Las Cuevas may refer to:

Places 
 Las Cuevas, Argentina
 Las Cuevas, Belize
 Las Cuevas, Bolivia
 Las Cuevas, Tamaulipas
 Las Cuevas, Trinidad and Tobago
 Navares de las Cuevas, a municipality located in the province of Segovia, Castile and León, Spain

People 
 Armand de Las Cuevas (1968–2018), a retired French racing cyclist
 Miguel de las Cuevas (born 1986), a Spanish football (soccer) player

Other 
 Las Cuevas War, a brief armed conflict between a force of Texas Rangers commanded by Capt. Leander McNelly and an irregular force of Mexican militia

See also 
 Cuevas (disambiguation)